Palao may refer to:

Places
Palao, a community in Namkha, Laos
Palao, a neighbourhood of San Martín de Porres District, Lima, Peru
Palao, a barangay in Bangued, Abra, Philippines
Palao, a barangay in Solana, Cagayan, Philippines
Pala-o, a barangay in Iligan, Lanao Del Norte, Philippines

People
Fernando Castro Palao (1581–1633), Spanish Jesuit theologian
Jimmy Palao (1879–1925), African-American jazz musician
George Palao (1940–2009), Gibraltarian historian and illustrator
Ryan Ong Palao (born 1982), Filipino-American drag performer and HIV awareness activist

See also
Palau, an island country located in the western Pacific Ocean
Palaw, a town in the Taninthayi Division, Myanmar
Pilaf, a dish consisting of rice cooked in a seasoned broth, sometimes called pulao or palao